Lilburn Mansion, also known as the Balderstones Mansion or Hazeldene is a historic home located in Ellicott City, Howard County, Maryland.

The site of the structure is on an original 2,500-acre land grant named the Valley of Owen. The gothic revival mansion was built on College avenue for Baltimore foundry owner  Henry Richard Hazlehurst in 1857. The house has architectural features that included a bell tower and solarium. A 1923 fire destroyed the front parlor and interior. The original 20 acres site has been subdivided down to 8 acres with the guesthouse and carport outbuildings demolished.

In later years, the mansion has been popularized by haunted house storytellers.

See also
Lilburn Cottages
Bon Air Manor (Ellicott City, Maryland)
MacAlpine

References

Houses completed in 1857
Howard County, Maryland landmarks
Houses in Howard County, Maryland
Buildings and structures in Ellicott City, Maryland
1857 establishments in Maryland